The Merzbach is a small river located in North Rhine-Westphalia, western Germany.

Geography
The mouth of the Merzbach is at the town of Linnich, where it becomes a western tributary of the Rur/Roer. The Rur/Roer is a tributary of the Meuse.

See also
List of rivers of North Rhine-Westphalia

References

Rivers of North Rhine-Westphalia
Rivers of Germany